A tristimulus colorimeter, colloquially shortened to colorimeter, is used in digital imaging to profile and calibrate output devices.
It takes a limited number of wideband spectral energy readings along the visible spectrum by using filtered photodetectors; e.g. silicon photodiodes.

A colorimeter with the known value of absolute error allows measuring (x,y)-chromaticity coordinates in red, green, blue and white colors. Measured values are used for calculation of LCD profile coefficients.

Originally, three glass filters whose transmittance spectra mimicked the CIE color matching functions (shown below) were employed. A filter bank may be used to decompose the individual color matching functions if more accuracy is desired.

A colorimeter or a digital camera with a color filter array can, under certain conditions, be used as an alternative to a spectrophotometer.

The illuminant and observer conditions should be specified when citing a measurement (e.g. D65/10°).

The quality of a colorimeter may be assessed using the means in CIE publication 179:2007.

There are various calibration methods for tristimulus colorimeters.

References

Color
Spectrometers
Laboratory equipment